Sarah Anne Matthews (born February 20, 1995) is an American political aide who served as the deputy press secretary for the Donald Trump administration.

Education
Matthews graduated in 2013 from Hoover High School in North Canton, Ohio. She earned a Bachelor of Arts degree in public relations from Kent State University in 2017.

Career 
Matthews worked as an intern for Senator Rob Portman and the former House Speaker John Boehner. She became press secretary of the House Committee on Energy and Commerce and joined Donald Trump’s presidential campaign in 2019. Matthews became deputy press secretary in 2020. She resigned after the 2021 United States Capitol attack.

Following the Trump administration, Matthews has served as the communications director for the Republican members of the United States House Select Committee on the Climate Crisis. 

After working in government, Matthews became a senior advisor for the Strategic Management Services company Merrimack Potomac + Charles.

Personal life
Matthews was born as one of two children to Jeffrey A., a Republican politician and Heidi R. Matthews. She has a sister named Emily C. Hyde.  Her grandfather was George Thomas Matthews (1935–2022), originally from Muskegon, Michigan, who later moved and lived in North Canton, Ohio, was a career metallurgist and engineer.

References

1995 births
Kent State University alumni
Living people
People from North Canton, Ohio
Trump administration personnel